Erik Mesterton (4 October 1903 – 10 January 2004) was a Swedish writer, literature critic and translator.

Together with poet Karin Boye he was editor for the influential culture magazine Spektrum in the 1930s (Modernist (T. S. Eliot was a favourite) and Freudian readings of literature were introduced. Mesterton lived in Gothenburg where he also did research on literature with scholars from the University of Gothenburg.

Selected translations
 Akhmatova, Anna: "Åtta dikter" (översatt tillsammans med Ebba Lindqvist. I tidskriften BLM, årg. 32 (1963): s. 350–355
 Eliot, T.S.: "Det öde landet" (översatt tillsammans med Karin Boye). Först i tidskriften Spektrum, 1932: 2, s. 25–44; omtryckt i Eliot, T.S.: Dikter (Bonnier, 1942), s. 17–37
 Eliot, T.S.: Sweeney Agonistes (översatt tillsammans med Erik Lindegren) (Bonnier, 1950)
 Erdman, Nikolai: En självmördares vedermödor: komedi (Samoubijca) (otryckt översättning, tillsammans med Tord Bæckström, för Göteborgs stadsteater 1969)
 Herbert, Zbigniew: I stridsvagnens spår: dikter 1956–1965 (översatt tillsammans med Erik Lindegren) (Bonnier, 1965)
 Herbert, Zbigniew: Rapport från en belägrad stad och andra dikter (tolkning av Agneta Pleijel och Daniel Bronski under medverkan av Erik Mesterton) (Bonnier, 1985)
 Lagerkvist, Pär: The eternal smile (Det eviga leendet) (översatt tillsammans med Denys W. Harding) (1934)
 Lagerkvist, Pär: Guest of reality (Gäst hos verkligheten) (översatt tillsammans med Denys W. Harding) (1936)
 Shakespeare, William: Hamlet (översatt tillsammans med Erik Lindegren) (Bonnier, 1967)

References

Men centenarians
Swedish-language writers
Swedish centenarians
Academic staff of the University of Gothenburg
Swedish people of Scottish descent
1903 births
2004 deaths